Daniel Henry Farrell (died 1870) was an Irish Whig politician.

References

External links
 

UK MPs 1841–1847
Whig (British political party) MPs for Irish constituencies
1870 deaths